Deborah De Robertis (born ) is a performance artist and photographer from Luxembourg.

Biography
De Robertis was born in Luxembourg on 12 February 1984.

Work

In 2014, she first came to media attention when she exposed her genitals at the Musée d'Orsay in front of Gustave Courbet's painting L'Origine du monde.

In 2016, she posed nude at the Musée d'Orsay in front of Édouard Manet's Olympia.

In 2018, De Robertis organised a happening during a yellow vests movement demonstration in Paris. Along with four other women dressed as Marianne, the symbolic figure of the French Republic, covered with silver paint and bare-chested, she stood silently facing a riot squad.

See also
Olympia (1865), painting by Édouard Manet
L'Origine du monde (1866), painting by Gustave Courbet
Marianne, French national symbol

References

External links

Living people
1984 births
Women performance artists
Luxembourgian photographers
Place of birth missing (living people)
Luxembourgian women artists
Women photographers